Art Sevada or Artak Sevada Grigorian (born July 23, 1972) is an Armenian-American motion picture screenwriter, producer, director, designer and an entrepreneur.

Early life 

Sevada was born in Abovyan, Armenia, in the family of a renowned artist, Samvel Sevada. He studied violin, piano, and woodwind instruments at the local music school in Abovyan. In 1990, he immigrated to the United States of America.

He studied at: 
1991 Herbert Hoover High School, Glendale, California
1995 Glendale Community College
1997 CSUN majoring in Visual Arts Graphic Design

Career 

He has released three albums of original music - Palpitation of a Soul (1995); Years of Solitude (1998); Disconnected (2000). All albums exclusively distributed by Garni Records (BMI).

In 1998, he founded Sevada Productions, where Art executed multimedia and advertising projects for artists, various types of companies and creative firms.

In 2005, Sevada started the filming of the Sevada Short Films Trilogy titled Mikosh starring Ofelia Zakaryan, later followed by As a Beginning and The Rope' starring Michael Poghosian and Sergey Danielyan. In 2008, he was invited to shoot a film called Three Colors in Black & White as part of a full-length film project shot by 12 Armenian directors dedicated to the capital city of Armenia, Yerevan.

He is also a CEO at GRIGOCORP, a media and products conglomerate, founded in 2015.

Personal life
Sevada is married to Gohar Sevada Grigorian and has two daughters, they reside in Los Angeles, CA.

See also
List of Armenians

External links

References

Living people
Film producers from California
1972 births
California State University, Northridge alumni
Film directors from Los Angeles